The 2018-19 Bulgarian Hockey League season was the 67th season of the Bulgarian Hockey League, the top level of ice hockey in Bulgaria. Four teams participated in the league, and Irbis-Skate Sofia won the championship.

Regular season 

Note: The February 26, 2019 game between Irbis-Skate Sofia and HC Slavia Sofia wasn't played.

References

External links 
 Season on eurohockey.com
 Season on eliteprospects.com

Bulgarian Hockey League seasons
Bul